Max Steel was first broadcast on February 26, 2000. The first season has 13 episodes, every episode starting with the letter "S". In the first four episodes, Josh and Max share the same face. In episode 5, Max appears for the first time with his actual face, which is completely different from Josh's, more mature and tough. However, the same old model of his face is reused in episode 9, "Sabres", presumably due to a change in the order of production of the episodes. The original presentation of the show portrayed Max chasing and fighting terrorists around the world. Because of this, after the September 11, 2001 attacks, the word "terrorist" was filtered out from some episodes, but not from the opening.

In season 1, there are some apparently inconsistent broadcast dates. One episode could have been aired in April, while the episode that should have followed it was not broadcast until September.
This was fixed in the following two seasons.

Series overview

Episodes

Season 1 (2000)

Season 2 (2000–01)

Season 3 (2001–02)

Post-TV series
Max Steel ended with the episode "Truth Be Told". After two years, a movie called Max Steel: Endangered Species  was released worldwide. Since then, the series was changed to a special movie for TV format instead of a TV series, with a movie being released every year.

In 2008, a new TV series, titled Turbo Missions, was shown on Cartoon Network in Latin America. These are short, 1-minute clips that show Max confronting villains from the movies (Extroyer, Psycho-bots, Elementor, etc.) or Max in a sports competition.

In 2011, Turbo Missions was renamed N-Tek Adventures.

In 2013, the series was given a TV series reboot. The first episode was broadcast on March 25, 2013, on Disney XD.

References

External links
 
 

Max Steel
Lists of American children's animated television series episodes
Lists of Canadian children's animated television series episodes